{{DISPLAYTITLE:National CO2 Air Pistol (.177)}}

The National  Air Pistol is a single shot air pistol with  powerplant. It is manufactured by National rifles division of the Indian Hume Pipe Co. Ltd of Ahmedabad, India.

Technical features 

Calibre: 4.5 mm / 0.177 
Barrel Length: 228mm 
Barrel: Rifled
Front Sight: 5 mm Wide
Rear Sight: 4.2 mm notch
Action: Bolt-action 
Capacity: 1 round(s).

See also 
 IHP National Airpistol
 IHP Airpistol 0.177

References

External links 
Manufacturer's Website

Air guns of India